Events from the year 1958 in the United States.

Incumbents

Federal government 
 President: Dwight D. Eisenhower (R-Kansas/Pennsylvania)
 Vice President: Richard Nixon (R-California)
 Chief Justice: Earl Warren (California)
 Speaker of the House of Representatives: Sam Rayburn (D-Texas)
 Senate Majority Leader: Lyndon B. Johnson (D-Texas)
 Congress: 85th

Events

January–March

 January 8 – Bobby Fischer, 14 years old at the time, wins the United States Chess Championship.
 January 13 – In One, Inc. v. Olesen, the Supreme Court affirms that homosexual writing is not per se obscene.
 January 18 
 Battle of Hayes Pond: Armed Lumbee Indians confront the Ku Klux Klan in Maxton, North Carolina.
 The first of Leonard Bernstein's Young People's Concerts with the New York Philharmonic is telecast by CBS. The Emmy-winning series (one concert approximately every 3 months except for the summer) will run for more than 14 years. It will make Bernstein's name a household word, and the most famous conductor in the U.S.
 January 28 – Hall of Fame baseball player Roy Campanella is involved in an automobile accident that ends his career and leaves him paralyzed.
 January 31 – The first successful American satellite, Explorer 1, is launched into orbit.
 February 5 – The Tybee Bomb, a 7,600 pound (3,500 kg) Mark 15 hydrogen bomb, is lost in the waters off Savannah, Georgia.
 February 11 – Ruth Carol Taylor is the first African American woman hired as a flight attendant. Working for Mohawk Airlines, her career lasts only six months, due to another discriminatory barrier – the airline's ban on married flight attendants.
 February 20 – A test rocket explodes at Cape Canaveral.
 February 28 – Prestonsburg, Kentucky bus disaster: The worst school bus accident in U.S. history up to this date occurs at Prestonsburg, Kentucky; 27 are killed.
 March 1 – Archbishop of Chicago Samuel Stritch is appointed Pro-Prefect of the Sacred Congregation for the Propagation of Faith, thus becoming the first American to head a dicastery of the Roman Curia.
 March 8 – The USS Wisconsin is decommissioned, leaving the United States Navy without an active battleship for the first time since 1896 (it is recommissioned October 22, 1988).
 March 11 – 1958 Mars Bluff B-47 nuclear weapon loss incident: A U.S. B-47 bomber accidentally drops an atom bomb on Mars Bluff, South Carolina. Its conventional explosives destroy a house and injure several people, but no nuclear fission occurs.
 March 17 
 The Convention on the Inter-Governmental Maritime Consultative Organization (IMCO) enters into force, founding the IMCO as a specialized agency of the United Nations.
 The United States launches the Vanguard 1 satellite.
 March 19 
 Monarch Underwear Company fire in New York.
 Warner Bros. Records, the company which would later become Warner Records, is founded by its namesake, Warner Bros. Pictures.
 March 24 – The U.S. Army inducts Elvis Presley, transforming "The King Of Rock & Roll" into U.S. private #53310761.
 March 26 
The United States Army launches Explorer 3.
The 30th Academy Awards ceremony, hosted by Bob Hope, Rosalind Russell, David Niven, James Stewart, Jack Lemmon and a premade animation of Donald Duck, is held at RKO Pantages Theatre in Hollywood. David Lean's The Bridge on the River Kwai wins seven awards, including Best Motion Picture and Best Director for Lean. Joshua Logan's Sayonara receives the most nominations with ten.

April–June
 April – Unemployment in Detroit reaches 20%, marking the height of the Recession of 1958 in the United States.
 April 15 – The San Francisco Giants beat the Los Angeles Dodgers 8–0 at San Francisco's Seals Stadium, in the first Major League Baseball regular-season game ever played in California.
 April 21 – A United Airlines DC-7 and U.S. Air Force F-100 Super Sabre fighter jet collide near Las Vegas, Nevada, killing all 49 aboard the two aircraft.
 May 9 – Actor-singer Paul Robeson, whose passport has been reinstated, sings in a sold-out one-man recital at Carnegie Hall. The recital is such a success that Robeson gives another one at Carnegie Hall a few days later. But after these two concerts, Robeson is seldom seen in public in the United States again. His Carnegie Hall concerts are later released on records and on CD.
 May 12 – A formal North American Aerospace Defense Command agreement is signed between the United States and Canada.
 May 13 – During a visit to Caracas, Venezuela, Vice President Richard M. Nixon's car is attacked by anti-American demonstrators.
 May 20 – A Capital Airlines airliner and Air National Guard jet collide near Brunswick, Maryland, killing 12.
 May 23 – Explorer 1 ceases transmission.
 May 30 – The bodies of unidentified soldiers killed in action during World War II and the Korean War are buried at the Tomb of the Unknowns in Arlington National Cemetery.
 June 2 – In San Simeon, California, Hearst Castle opens to the public for guided tours.
 June 8 – The  is launched; it will be the largest freighter on the Great Lakes for more than a dozen years.
 June 15 – The first Pizza Hut restaurant opens in Wichita, Kansas.
 June 17 – The U.S. condemns the execution of Imre Nagy as a "shocking act of cruelty".

July–September

 July – The plastic hula hoop is first marketed.
 July 3 – 1958 US–UK Mutual Defence Agreement signed in Washington, D.C.
 July 7 – President Dwight D. Eisenhower signs the Alaska Statehood Act into United States law.
 July 9 – 1958 Lituya Bay megatsunami: A 7.8  strike-slip earthquake in Southeast Alaska causes a landslide that produces a megatsunami. The runup from the waves reached  on the rim of Lituya Bay.
 July 15 – During the 1958 Lebanon crisis, 5,000 United States Marines land in the capital Beirut in order to protect the pro-Western government there.
 July 29 – The U.S. Congress formally creates the National Aeronautics and Space Administration (NASA).
 August 3 – The nuclear powered submarine USS Nautilus becomes the first vessel to cross the North Pole under water.
 August 12 – The Federal Switchblade Act is enacted in the United States.
 August 17 – The first Thor-Able rocket is launched, carrying Pioneer 0, from Cape Canaveral Air Force Station Launch Complex 17. The launch fails due to a first stage malfunction.
 August 18 – Vladimir Nabokov's controversial novel Lolita is published in the United States.
 August 18 - Hawaii becomes the 50th State
 August 21–October 15 – Illinois observes the centennial of the Lincoln–Douglas debates.
 August 23 – President Dwight D. Eisenhower  signs the Federal Aviation Act of 1958, transferring all authority over aviation in the U.S. to the newly created Federal Aviation Agency (FAA, later renamed Federal Aviation Administration).
 August 27 – Operation Argus: The United States begins nuclear tests over the South Atlantic.
 September – The University of New Orleans begins classes as the first racially integrated public university in the Southern United States.
 September 15 – Newark Bay rail accident kills 48 people and injures the same number.
 September 18 – "Fresno Drop": BankAmericard, the first credit card to be widely offered, is launched in Fresno, California.
 September 23 – The Spirit of Detroit statue is dedicated in Detroit, Michigan.

October–December
 October 1 – NASA starts operations and replaces the National Advisory Committee for Aeronautics.
 October 9 – The New York Yankees defeat the Milwaukee Braves, 4 games to 3, to win their 18th World Series Title.
 October 11 – Pioneer 1, the second and most successful of the three-project Able space probes, becomes the first spacecraft launched by the newly formed NASA.
 November 12 – The Nose (El Capitan) in Yosemite National Park is first climbed, by Warren Harding, Wayne Merry and George Whitmore in 47 days.
 November 20 – The Jim Henson Company is founded as Muppets, Inc.
 November 23 – Have Gun, Will Travel debuts on American radio.
 December 1 – Our Lady of the Angels School fire: At least 90 students and 3 nuns are killed in a fire at Our Lady of the Angels School in Chicago.
 December 6 – A third Thor-Able rocket launch, carrying the Pioneer 2 probe, is unsuccessful due to a third-stage ignition failure.
 December 9 – The right-wing John Birch Society is founded in the U.S. by Robert W. Welch Jr., a retired candy manufacturer.
 December 19 – A message from President Dwight D. Eisenhower is broadcast from SCORE, the world's first communications satellite, launched by the U.S. the previous day.
 December 25 – Tchaikovsky's ballet The Nutcracker (the George Balanchine version) is shown on prime-time television in color for the first time, as an episode of the CBS anthology series Playhouse 90.
 December 28 – 1958 NFL Championship Game: The Baltimore Colts beat the New York Giants 23–17 in overtime to win the NFL Championship in American football.

Undated
 Based on birth rates (per 1,000 population), the post-war baby boom ends in the United States as an 11-year decline in the birth rate begins (the longest on record in the country).
 The United Kingdom, Soviet Union and the U.S. agree to stop testing atomic bombs for 3 years.
 Robert Frank publishes his photographic essay The Americans (in Paris).
 The PBA Tour is established by the Professional Bowlers Association at its headquarters in Seattle for ten-pin bowling.

Ongoing
 Cold War (1947–1991)
 Space Race (1957–1975)

Births

January

 January 1
 Dave Silk, American ice hockey player and coach
 Grandmaster Flash, born Joseph Saddler, African American hip-hop/rap DJ
 January 4
 Andy Borowitz, American comedian and author
 Lorna Doom, musician (d. 2019) 
 James J. Greco, American businessman 
 Jim Powers, American wrestler
 January 6 – Scott Bryce, actor, director, and producer
 January 8 – Betsy DeVos, 11th United States Secretary of Education
 January 9 – Rob McClanahan, ice hockey player
 January 10 – Eddie Cheever, race car driver
 January 11
 Alyson Reed, dancer and actress
 Vicki Peterson, rock musician (The Bangles)
 January 12 – Curt Fraser, American ice hockey coach
 January 14 – Patricia Morrison, American singer-songwriter and bass player
 January 20 – Lorenzo Lamas, American actor, martial artist and reality show participant
 January 21 – Gareth Branwyn, American journalist and critic
 January 23 – Steve Christoff, ice hockey player
 January 24 – Neil Allen, baseball player and coach
 January 26
 Anita Baker, African-American soul and R&B singer
 Xavier Becerra, politician and attorney, Attorney General of California 
 Ellen DeGeneres, American actress and comedian
 January 27 – Susanna Thompson, American actress
 January 29 – Stephen Lerner, American labor and community activist

February

 February 7 – Kevin Schon, American voice actor
 February 8 – Sherri Martel, American professional wrestler (d. 2007)
 February 16 
 Nancy Donahue, American fashion model and entrepreneur
 Ice-T, born Tracy Marrow, American rapper
 Lisa Loring, American actress (d. 2023)
 February 17 – Alan Wiggins, American baseball player (d. 1991)
 February 18 – Gar Samuelson, American drummer (d. 1999)
 February 19 – Leslie David Baker, African-American actor 
 February 21
 Jack Coleman, American actor and screenwriter
 Denise Dowse, American actress and director 
 Jake Steinfeld, American actor
 Mary Chapin Carpenter, American singer
 February 24 – Todd Fisher, American actor
 February 25 – Kurt Rambis, American basketball player
 February 26
 Susan J. Helms, American astronaut
 Tim Kaine, American politician
 Chris Phillips, American voice actor
 February 27 
 Maggie Hassan, American politician
 Michael LeMoyne Kennedy, American lawyer and activist (died 1997)
 Nancy Spungen, American groupie and girlfriend of Sid Vicious (died 1978)
 February 28 – Mark Pavelich, American professional ice hockey player

March

 March 4 – Patricia Heaton, American actress
 March 9 
 Linda Fiorentino, American actress or 1960 (sources differ)
 Mary Murphy, dance choreographer 
 March 10
 Steve Howe, American baseball player (died 2006)
 Sharon Stone, American actress and producer
 March 11 – Anissa Jones, American child actress (“Family Affair”) (died 1976) 
 March 15 – John Friedrich, American actor
 March 18
 John Elefante, American singer and producer (Kansas)
 Kayo Hatta, American film director (d. 2005)
 March 20 – Holly Hunter, American actress
 March 23
 Eldon Hoke, American singer and drummer (d. 1997)
 Michael Sorich, American voice actor, actor, writer, director and voice director
 March 25
 John Ensign, politician
 James McDaniel, actor 
 March 26 – Todd Joseph Miles Holden, American-born social scientist, author, basketball coach
 March 28
 Bart Conner, American gymnast
 Curt Hennig, American professional wrestler (died 2003)
 March 31 – Lisa Michelson, American voice actress (died 1991)

April

 April 1 – D. Boon, American singer and guitarist (d. 1985)
 April 3 – Alec Baldwin, American actor, producer and comedian
 April 4 – Constance Shulman, American actress
 April 12 – Annette McCarthy, American actress (d. 2023)
 April 14 – John D'Aquino, American film and television actor
 April 21 – Andie MacDowell, American actress
 April 26 – Giancarlo Esposito, Italian-American actor
 April 28 – Hal Sutton, American golfer
 April 29
 Michelle Pfeiffer, American actress
 Eve Plumb, American actress

May

 May 4 – Keith Haring, American artist (d. 1990)
 May 8 – Lovie Smith, American football player and coach
 May 10 
 Rick Santorum, American politician
 Ellen Ochoa, American astronaut, first Hispanic woman to go into space 
 May 11 
 Christian Brando, American actor and eldest child of Marlon Brando (d. 2008)
 Walt Terrell, American baseball player
 May 12 
 Jennifer Hetrick, American actress
 Tony Oliver, American voice actor
 Eric Singer, American rock drummer
 May 15 – Ron Simmons, American professional wrestler
 May 19 – Jenny Durkan, American politician
 May 20 
 Ron Reagan, political pundit and son of U.S. president Ronald Reagan
 Jane Wiedlin, American musician and actress
 May 21 – Tom Feeney, American politician
 May 23
 Mitch Albom, American author
 Drew Carey, American comedian and actor
 Lea DeLaria, American comedian and actress
 May 25 – Carrie Newcomer, American singer-songwriter & musician
 May 26 – Margaret Colin, American actress
 May 27 – Linnea Quigley, American actress
 May 28 – Ric Edelman, American investor and author
 May 29 – Annette Bening, American actress
 May 30 – Ted McGinley, American actor

June

 June 2 
 Lex Luger, former American professional wrestler
 Brian Regan, American stand-up comedian
 June 4 – Gordon P. Robertson, American televangelist and son of Pat Robertson
 June 5 
 Ahmed Abdallah Mohamed Sambi, Comoroan businessman and politician, President of Comoros
 Eric Strobel, American professional ice hockey player
 Warren Thomas, American comedian (d. 2005) 
 June 7 – Prince, born Prince Rogers Nelson, African-American rock musician (d. 2016)
 June 8
 Cyril O'Reilly, American actor
 Keenen Ivory Wayans, African-American comedian, actor, and director
 June 9 – Tony Horwitz, American journalist and author (d. 2019)
 June 10 – James F. Conant, American philosopher
 June 11 – Tim Draper, American venture capitalist
 June 12
 Rebecca Holden, American actress, singer, and entertainer
 Meredith Brooks, American singer, songwriter and guitarist
 June 14 
 Eric Heiden, American speed skater
 Pamela Geller, American activist and blogger  
 June 15 – Wade Boggs, American baseball player
 June 17 – Jello Biafra, American punk musician and activist 
 June 20
 Ron Hornaday Jr., American race car driver
 Chuck Wagner, American actor
 June 21 – Eric Douglas, American actor (d. 2004)
 June 22 
 Bruce Campbell, American actor, producer, writer and director
 June 24 
 John Tortorella, American ice hockey coach
 Tom Lister Jr., American actor and professional wrestler (d. 2020)
 June 26 – Glen Stewart Godwin, American fugitive and convicted murderer
 June 27 – Jeffrey Lee Pierce, American musician (d. 1996)
 June 29 – Jeff Coopwood, American actor, broadcaster and singer
 June 30 – Tommy Keene, American singer-songwriter (d. 2017)

July
 July 2 – Thomas Bickerton, Methodist bishop
 July 5 – Bill Watterson, cartoonist and the author of the comic strip Calvin and Hobbes
 July 8 – Kevin Bacon, actor
 July 11 – Stephanie Dabney, ballerina (d. 2022)
 July 13 
 Roger L. Jackson, voice actor
 Dan Schachte, hockey linesman (d. 2022)
 July 15 – Mac Thornberry, politician
 July 16 
 Mick Cornett, politician
 Michael Flatley, American-Irish dancer and choreographer
 Mike Rogers,  politician
 July 20 – Billy Mays, salesman (d. 2009)

August

 August 1 – Michael Penn, American singer
 August 7 − Buddy Dyer, American politician
 August 10 – Don Swayze, American actor
 August 13 – Lizzie Grey, American musician (d. 2019)
 August 15 – Rondell Sheridan, American actor
 August 16
 Angela Bassett, African-American screen actress and film director
 Madonna, born Madonna Louise Ciccone, pop singer and performer
 August 17 – Belinda Carlisle, pop rock singer
 August 18
 Reg E. Cathey, African-American actor (d. 2018)
 Madeleine Stowe, American actress
 August 19 
 Anthony Muñoz, American football player
 Rick Snyder, politician
 August 20 – Michael Silka, American spree killer (d. 1984)
 August 22
 Brady Boone, American professional wrestler (d. 1998)
 Colm Feore, American-born Canadian actor
 August 24 – Steve Guttenberg, American actor
 August 25 
 Tim Burton, American film director
 Christian LeBlanc, American actor
 August 26 – Billy Ray Irick, American convicted murderer (d. 2018)
 August 28 – Colm Feore, American-Canadian actor
 August 29 – Michael Jackson, African-American singer and musician (d. 2009)
 August 31 – Julie Brown, American actress

September

 September 4 – Drew Pinsky, American celebrity doctor
 September 6 – Jeff Foxworthy, American comedian
 September 10 – Chris Columbus, American film director, writer, and producer
 September 11 
 Brad Lesley, American baseball player (died 2013)
 Scott Patterson, American actor 
 Phoef Sutton, American screenwriter and producer
 September 15 – Wendie Jo Sperber, American actress (died 2005)  
 September 16 
 Orel Hershiser, American baseball player
 Jennifer Tilly, Canadian-American actress
 September 18 – Jeff Bostic, American football player 
 September 22 – Joan Jett, American rock musician
 September 23 – Marvin Lewis, American football coach 
 September 24 – Kevin Sorbo, American actor
 September 26 – Darby Crash, American rock songwriter, singer (Germs) (died 1980)
 September 27 – Shaun Cassidy, American actor, producer and screenwriter
 September 30 – Marty Stuart, American singer

October

 October 4
 Ned Luke, American actor
 Wendy Makkena, American actress
 October 5 – Neil deGrasse Tyson, African-American astrophysicist
 October 9 – Michael Paré, American actor
 October 10 – Tanya Tucker, American singer
 October 13 – Maria Cantwell, American politician
 October 16 – Tim Robbins, American actor and director
 October 17 – Alan Jackson, American country singer and songwriter
 October 18 – Letitia James, American lawyer, activist and politician
 October 20
 Scott Hall, American professional wrestler (died 2022)
 Viggo Mortensen, Danish-American actor
 October 22 – Keena Turner, American football player 
 October 24
 Vincent K. Brooks, American general
 Chip Hooper, American tennis player and coach

November

 November 2 – Willie McGee, African-American baseball player
 November 5 – Robert Patrick, American actor
 November 8 – Jeff Speakman, American actor and martial artist
 November 12 
 Megan Mullally, American actress, singer and media personality
 Nick Stellino, Italian-American chef and author
 November 16 – Marg Helgenberger, American actress
 November 17 – Mary Elizabeth Mastrantonio, American actress and singer
 November 18
 Oscar Nunez, Cuban-American actor and comedian
 Kath Weston, American anthropologist, author and academic
 November 19 – Michael Wilbon, American sportswriter
 November 22 – Jamie Lee Curtis, American actress and author
 November 25 – Darlanne Fluegel, American actress
 November 28 – Dave Righetti, American baseball player
 November 30 – Stacey Q, American singer & actress

December
 December 1 – Charlene Tilton, American actress
 December 6 – Debbie Rowe, American ex-wife of Michael Jackson 
 December 11
 Tom Shadyac, American director and producer
 Nikki Sixx, rock musician
 Isabella Hofmann, actress
 December 13 – Lynn-Holly Johnson, ice skater and actress
 December 22 – Lenny von Dohlen, American actor (d. 2022)
 December 25
 Hanford Dixon, American football player
 Rickey Henderson, African-American baseball player
 Cheryl Chase, American voice actress and singer
 December 28 
 Twila Paris, Christian musician
 Joe Diffie, country singer (died 2020)
 December 31 – Bebe Neuwirth, American actress

Full date unknown
 Karl Fields, university professor

Deaths
 January 1
 Archie Alexander, designer (born 1888)
 William T. Bovie, biophysicist and inventor (born 1882)
 Edward Weston, photographer (born 1886)
 January 6 – Lois Irene Marshall, wife of Thomas R. Marshall, Second Lady of the United States (born 1873)
 January 8 – Mary Colter, architect and designer (born 1869)
 January 11 – Edna Purviance, silent film actress (born 1895)
 January 13 – Jesse L. Lasky, film producer (born 1880)
 February 1 – Clinton Davisson, physicist, winner of the Nobel Prize in Physics in 1937 (born 1888)
 February 4
 Monta Bell, actor and director (born 1891)  
 Henry Kuttner, author (born 1915)  
 February 27 – Harry Cohn, film producer (born 1891)
 March 22 (in plane crash)
 Mike Todd, film producer (born 1909)
 Art Cohn, screenwriter (born 1909)
 March 28
 W. C. Handy, African American blues composer (born 1873)
 Chuck Klein, baseball player (born 1904)
 April 2 – Michael MacDonald, unseen subject of "Tragedy by the Sea" (b. 1952)
 May 5 – James Branch Cabell, fantasy writer (born 1879)
 June 10 – Angelina Weld Grimke, African American lesbian journalist and poet (born 1880)
 July 9 – James H. Flatley, naval aviator and admiral (born 1906)
 July 26 – Eugene Millikin, U.S. Senator from Colorado from 1941 to 1957 (born 1891)
 July 30 – William A. Glassford, admiral (born 1886)
 August 14 or 15 – Big Bill Broonzy, African American blues singer-songwriter (born 1893)
 August 27 – Ernest Lawrence, nuclear physicist, winner of the Nobel Prize in Physics in 1939 (born 1901)
 August 29 – Marjorie Flack, artist, illustrator and writer (born 1897)
 September 15 – Snuffy Stirnweiss, baseball player (born 1918)
 September 25 – John B. Watson, psychologist (born 1878)
 October 7 – Louise Hammond Willis Snead, artist, writer, and composer (born 1868)
 October 19 – Mary F. Hoyt, first woman appointed to the U.S. federal civil service, in 1883 (born 1858)
 October 27 – Marshall Neilan, actor and director (born 1891) 
 October 29 – Zoë Akins, playwright, poet and author (born 1886)
 November 15
 Samuel Hopkins Adams, writer (born 1871)
 Tyrone Power, actor (born 1914)
 November 21:
 Mel Ott, baseball player (born 1909) 
 Lion Feuchtwanger, German-American novelist and playwright (born 1884)
 November 24 – Harry Parke, comedian (born 1904)  
 December 29 – Doris Humphrey, dancer and choreographer (born 1895)

See also
 List of American films of 1958
 Timeline of United States history (1950–1969)

References

External links
 

 
1950s in the United States
United States
United States
Years of the 20th century in the United States